Monica Niculescu was the defending champion, but retired in the quarterfinals against Carla Suárez Navarro.
Klára Zakopalová won the title, defeating Garbiñe Muguruza in the final, 4–6, 7–5, 6–0.

Seeds

 Carla Suárez Navarro (semifinals)
 Garbiñe Muguruza (final)
 Klára Zakopalová (champion)
 Francesca Schiavone (first round)
 Monica Niculescu (quarterfinals, retired)
 Alexandra Cadanțu (quarterfinals)
 María Teresa Torró Flor (first round)
 Paula Ormaechea (second round)

Draw

Finals

Top half

Bottom half

Qualifying

Seeds

Qualifiers

Qualifying draw

First qualifier

Second qualifier

Third qualifier

Fourth qualifier

Fifth qualifier

Sixth qualifier

References
Main Draw
Qualifying Draw

Brasil Tennis Cup - Singles
2014 Singles